Karthalipalem, also called Palem, is a village in Srikakulam district of the Indian state of Andhra Pradesh. It is located in Sompeta mandal and the Mahendratanaya River flows besides the village.

Demographics
The Karthalipalem village has population of 2853 of which 1414 are males while 1439 are females as per Population 2011, Indian Census.

Government and politics 
Karthalipalem Gram Panchayat is the Local self-government of the village The panchayat has a total of 11 wards and each ward is represented by an elected ward member The ward members are headed by a Sarpanch.

References

Villages in Srikakulam district